Mitzpe Dani (lit. Danny Lookout) is an Israeli outpost in the West Bank. Located near Ma'ale Mikhmas, it falls under the jurisdiction of the Mateh Binyamin Regional Council. It is home to around 25 families.

The outpost was established in 1998 by residents of Ma'ale Mikhmas, and was named after Danny Frei, a settler from Ma'ale Mikhmas who was killed in a Palestinian attack on his home in 1995.

The international community considers Israeli settlements in the West Bank illegal under international law, but the Israeli government disputes this.

References

Israeli settlements in the West Bank
Populated places established in 1998
Mateh Binyamin Regional Council
Israeli outposts
Unauthorized Israeli settlements